Roberto Haas (born 22 January 1946) is an Argentine sailor. He competed in the Finn event at the 1972 Summer Olympics.

References

External links
 

1946 births
Living people
Argentine male sailors (sport)
Olympic sailors of Argentina
Sailors at the 1972 Summer Olympics – Finn
Place of birth missing (living people)